Krivci is a village in the municipality of Debar, North Macedonia.

Demographics
As of the 2021 census, Krivci had 3 residents with the following ethnic composition:
Albanians 3

According to the 2002 census, the village had a total of 9 inhabitants. Ethnic groups in the village include:
Albanians 9

References

External links

Villages in Debar Municipality
Albanian communities in North Macedonia